Héctor Eduardo Chumpitaz Gonzáles (born April 12, 1943, in Cañete) is a former footballer from Peru. Voted one of the greatest defenders of all times, among the 30 best defenders in football history and included within the 100 best players in the history of the Soccer World Cup by FIFA in 2018. He is also a member of the Historic Ideal Team of Copa América by CONMEBOL. In addition to being the seventh South American defender with the highest score in soccer history, after scoring 65 official goals.

Considered by FIFA as one of the best South American defenders of all time, he is also one of the greatest exponents in the history of Peruvian football. He worked in the defense position. He spent most of his career at  Universitario de Deportes and Sporting Cristal. He currently has a soccer school named as him, where he is dedicated to training minors.

He was regarded one of the best defenders in the world during the late 60s and early 70s and is considered one of the 4 best South American defenders of all time along with Elías Figueroa, José Nasazzi and Daniel Passarella. With great defensive skills, excellent reading of the game, possession and distribution of the ball and an imposing leader role, he became one of the most legendary figures of  Universitario de Deportes, a club with which he achieved 5 times the  Peruvian League and was a finalist in the Copa Libertadores in 1972.

In addition to having won three other national titles with Sporting Cristal, Chumpitaz is remembered for having been captain of the American team that played a friendly match against the stars of Europe, among them were Giacinto Facchetti, Eusébio da Silva Ferreira, Johan Cruyff —who was the captain of Europe, among other figures. It is there that the nickname El Capitán de America (America's Captain) is gained.

At the national team level, for almost fifteen years he was the captain and great defensive bulwark of the Peru national football team that won the Copa América 1975 and reached the quarterfinals in the Soccer World Cup of Mexico 1970 and Argentina 1978.

Chumpitaz is considered one of the greatest South American defenders of all-time and was named to the list of best World Cup players of all time by Terra.com in 2006. He was elected the 35th best South American footballer of the 20th century in a poll by the IFFHS in 2000.

Career
At the age of 19, Chumpitaz joined a second division team in Peru, the Unidad Vecinal. Chumpitaz became a first division player in 1964, when he was signed by Deportivo Municipal, a team where he stayed until 1965.

During 1966, Chumpitaz began playing for Universitario de Deportes, where he was part of the team that won 5 Peruvian league championships (1966, 1967, 1969, 1971 and 1974).

Chumpitaz captained the Universitario de Deportes side to a runner up in the Copa Libertadores 1972, losing 2–1 to Independiente of the Argentina in the final.

In 1973, All-Star teams from the American and European continents played against each other in Barcelona, Spain. Soccer greats such as Johan Cruyff and Franz Beckenbauer participated in that game.  Chumpitaz was selected captain of the American continent's team thus earning the nickname America's Captain. The game finishes 4–4 and in Penalty kicks, America wins 7–6.

The following year, he was signed, for the first time, by an international club, when he played with the Club Atlas team in Mexico.

In 1977, he went on to play for Sporting Cristal, a team he would play with until 1984. He won 3 Peruvian league championships (1979, 1980 and 1983).

He became the national soccer top scoring defender of Peruvian Primera División, with 65 goals in 456 matches.

International career
On April 3, 1965, Chumpitaz played his debut game with the Peru national football team when Peru lost to Paraguay, 1–0, in Lima. On May 16, 1965, Chumpitaz played his debut World Cup qualifier game where Peru beat Venezuela, 1–0, in Lima. His debut international game came that same year as Peru and Venezuela held a rematch in Caracas, with Peru defeating the Venezuelans, 6–3.

Chumpitaz secured his first World Cup action when Peru national football team, winning 1–0 in Lima, and soon tied with Argentina, 2–2, on August 31, 1969, in Buenos Aires. Chumpitaz played his first World Cup game on June 2, 1970, when the Peru defeated Bulgaria, 3–2, in León, Mexico. Although Peru advanced to the quarterfinals of that World Cup, they were eliminated by Brazil on June 14 in Guadalajara, by a score of 4–2.

Chumpitaz played for Peru's national team in the Brazil Independence Cup, held between June 18 and 25, 1972, in Manaus, Brazil. He helped his team to the championship game with a 1–0 victory over Venezuela, but Peru lost in its group's final game to Yugoslavia, 2–1.

In 1975, Chumpitaz played for the national team that won the Copa America held in Colombia.

Chumpitaz returned to the World Cup in 1978, when Peru played for the FIFA's most heralded championship in Argentina. Peru played six games in that World Cup, winning two of them. Peru were eliminated after losing to hosts Argentina, 6–0. Chumpitaz was substituted 10 minutes into the second half of a game repeatedly mired in allegations of match-fixing to allow Argentina to qualify for the final at the expense of Brazil. Chumpitaz for his part said there was no reason for his substitution. This would turn out to be Chumpitaz's last World Cup participation; he retired from the Peru national football team after the team qualified for the 1982 World Cup, held in Spain. Chumpitaz played a total of 105 games with the national team.

International goals

Honours

Universitario de Deportes
Peruvian League
Winner (5): 1966, 1967, 1969, 1971, 1974
Runner-up (1): 1972
Copa Libertadores
Runner-up (1): 1972

Sporting Cristal
Peruvian League
Winner (3): 1979, 1980, 1983
Runner-up (1): 1977

National team
Copa América
Winner (1): 1975

Individual awards
1969 Best Defender CONMEBOL
1971 Best Defender CONMEBOL
1973 All Stars CONMEBOL: Captain 
2000 World Soccer's: The 100 Greatest Footballers of All Time
2004 South American – Player of the Century: Ranking Nº 35
2007 Midfield Dynamo's 10 Heroes of the Copa América
 2007 Copa America All-Star team, all-time
2008 All Stars CONMEBOL in the last 50 years
 2008 Defender all-time scoring: Ranking Nº 32

Career statistics

Current life
Despite retiring, Chumpitaz continued being a public figure, and, on December 3, 2004, he was found guilty and sentenced to four years of suspended sentence (probation), for allegedly accepting US$30,000 from presidential advisor and right-hand man Vladimiro Montesinos, supposedly after joining former minister Juan Carlos Hurtado in latter's quest to become mayor of Lima in 1998, during Alberto Fujimori's presidency. After the appeals process, on April 8, 2005, the Supreme Court of Peru nullified the sentence against Chumpitaz.

See also
 List of men's footballers with 100 or more international caps

References

External links
arkivperu.com, in Spanish 
cooperativa.cl, in Spanish
rsssf.com
terra.com

1944 births
Living people
People from Lima Region
Association football defenders
Peruvian footballers
Peru international footballers
Deportivo Municipal footballers
Club Universitario de Deportes footballers
Atlas F.C. footballers
Sporting Cristal footballers
Peruvian football managers
Sporting Cristal managers
Deportivo Municipal managers
Peruvian Primera División players
Liga MX players
1970 FIFA World Cup players
1975 Copa América players
1978 FIFA World Cup players
FIFA Century Club
Peruvian expatriate footballers
Expatriate footballers in Mexico
Peruvian expatriate sportspeople in Mexico
Copa América-winning players